Lieutenant General Sir Denis Stuart Scott (Rory) O'Connor,  (2 July 1907 – 18 January 1988) was a senior British Army officer who served as General Officer Commanding Aldershot District from 1960 to 1961.

Military career
After attending the Royal Military Academy, Woolwich, O'Connor was commissioned into the Royal Artillery in September 1927, and was deployed in India from 1929 to 1935.

O'Connor served in the Second World War, initially as an instructor at the Staff College, Camberley and then with the 11th Armoured Division. He was appointed Commanding Officer of 63rd Medium Artillery Regiment in North West Europe in 1944 and was then deployed with the Fourteenth Army to Burma in 1945.

After the war O'Connor became Director of Plans to the Supreme Allied Commander for South East Asia Command before becoming a brigadier on the General Staff of Middle East Command in 1946. After attending the Imperial Defence College in 1950, he was appointed Chief Instructor at the Royal School of Artillery in 1951 and Commander Royal Artillery for 11th Armoured Division in 1953.

O'Connor became Director of Plans at the War Office in 1955 and General Officer Commanding 6th Armoured Division in 1957. He was made Chief Army Instructor at the Imperial Defence College in London in 1958 and GOC Aldershot District in 1960. He was appointed Deputy Chief of the Defence Staff in 1962 and Commander of British Forces in Hong Kong in 1964. He retired in 1966.

References

External links
Generals of World War II

 

|-
 

|-

1907 births
1988 deaths
British Army generals
Knights Commander of the Order of the British Empire
Companions of the Order of the Bath
Royal Artillery officers
British Army personnel of World War II
People from Shimla
Academics of the Staff College, Camberley
Military personnel of British India
Graduates of the Royal College of Defence Studies
Graduates of the Royal Military Academy, Woolwich